Quest for the Rings is a board game/video game hybrid for the Magnavox Odyssey². It is the first game in the Odyssey² "Master Strategy Series", and contemporary reviews described it as innovative.

Gameplay
The game supports one to three players.

Plot
Quest for the Rings is a game in which the heroes search for 10 magical keys which the Ringmaster (a role played by a human player) has hidden.

Reception
Quest for the Rings was favorably reviewed by Video magazine in its "Arcade Alley" column where it was described as "an instant classic" with "'super hit' stamped all over it in gold letters". The combination of video game and board game elements was considered to be particularly well conceived, producing what the reviewers called "a vigorous new hybrid unlike anything ever seen in home arcading." It was awarded "Most Innovative Game" at the 3rd annual Arkie Awards where it was described as "stand[ing] out like Charlene Tilton at a spinster's convention". Arkie Award judges commented that "every element of Quest is absolutely first-rate from the animation of the various creatures to the clean rules", and the game was additionally awarded an Honorable Mention in the category of "Best Audio-Visual Effects". Electronic Games reviewed Quest for the Rings as part of its 1983 Players Guide to Fantasy Games.

References

External links
Review in Creative Computing
Another review in Electronic Games

1981 video games
Board games
Magnavox Odyssey 2 games
Video games developed in the United States
Video games set in castles